Vollsjö is a locality situated in Sjöbo Municipality, Skåne County, Sweden with 836 inhabitants in 2010.

References 

Populated places in Sjöbo Municipality
Populated places in Skåne County